"A little lower than the angels" is a phrase from Epistle to the Hebrews Chapter 2. It is a citation of Psalm 8:5 and a frequent locus of Christological controversy throughout the history of Christianity and theology.

Source passages
The original phrase is drawn from Psalm 8:5, however the author of Hebrews follows the Greek of the Septuagint with the reading "lower than the angels" (Hebrews 2:7) instead of the Hebrew "lower than God." The original Hebrew text is usually construed as "you made him [man] lower than God", while the Septuagint has the meaning "you made him [man] lower than the angels".

History of exegesis
The passage occupies a central place in Tertullian's Adversus Praxean.

The passage was the occasion of the break in friendship between Erasmus and Jacques Lefèvre d'Étaples. Lefèvre argued that the passage in Hebrews, although it clearly says "angels" in the Greek, should still be understood according to the original source in the Hebrew text with "lower than God", while Erasmus argued that exegesis of Hebrews 2 should follow the Septuagint of Psalm 8:5. Erasmus took the controversy to the extent of publishing seventy-two reasons why his interpretation was to be preferred.

References

New Testament words and phrases